Marcelo "Marcelinho" Tieppo Huertas (born 25 May 1983) is a Brazilian professional basketball player for Iberostar Tenerife of the Spanish Liga ACB. He is also a member of the senior men's Brazilian national basketball team, and holds Italian citizenship. At 32 years old he was the second oldest rookie in the NBA after Pablo Prigioni and before Andre Ingram. After signing with the Lakers in 2015 he played 1 and a half seasons with the Lakers before returning to Spain in 2017.

Professional career

Early years in Brazil and Texas
Huertas began his career playing with the youth basketball teams of the multi-sports club E.C. Pinheiros in Brazil. After playing high school basketball at Coppell High School in Coppell, Texas, he made his senior men's team debut in the 2001–02 season, with the senior men's team of FMU São Paulo. He then moved to the senior men's basketball team of E.C. Pinheiros, for the 2002–03 season, where he played in the top Brazilian League. He then returned to FMU São Paulo for the 2003–04 season.

Europe
Huertas joined the Spanish club DKV Joventut in 2004, and stayed there until 2007. Next, he moved to the Spanish club Bilbao Basket for the 2007–08 season. He then played with Fortitudo Bologna in the Italian League, during the 2008–09 season. In August 2009, he signed a three-year contract with the Spanish League club Caja Laboral. On 9 August 2011, he signed a four-year contract with the Spanish League club Regal FC Barcelona

Los Angeles Lakers (2015–2017)
On 9 September 2015, Huertas signed with the Los Angeles Lakers. He made his debut for the Lakers in the team's season opener against the Minnesota Timberwolves on 28 October, recording 2 points, 2 rebounds, and 2 assists in a 112–111 loss. On 6 March 2016, he recorded season-highs of 10 points and 9 assists in a 112–95 win over the Golden State Warriors. Four days later, he had a season-best game with 13 points and 5 assists in a 120–108 loss to the Cleveland Cavaliers.

On 5 August 2016, Huertas re-signed with the Lakers. On 23 February 2017, Huertas was traded to the Houston Rockets in exchange for Tyler Ennis. Upon being acquired by the Rockets, Huertas was waived by the team.

Return to Spain
On 25 July 2017, Huertas signed a two-year deal with Baskonia.

Canarias (2019–present) 
On 23 July 2019, Huertas signed a two-year deal with Canarias (known as Iberostar Tenerife for sponsorship reasons). He averaged 12.9 points and 8.3 assists per game in his debut season for Canarias. Huertas re-signed with the team on 4 June 2020. 

Huertas became a star player for the team, and he was named to the All-Basketball Champions League First Team in 2020, and the second team in 2022. He also won the 2020 and 2023 FIBA Intercontinental Cup titles, gathering MVP honours in the first win.

National team career
Huertas has been a member of the senior men's Brazilian national basketball team. With Brazil's senior national team, he won the gold medal at the 2005 FIBA Americas Championship, the 2006 South American Championship, the 2007 Pan American Games, and the 2009 FIBA Americas Championship. He also won the silver medal at the 2011 FIBA Americas Championship.

He also played at the following tournaments: the 2006 FIBA World Championship, the 2010 FIBA World Championship, the 2012 Summer Olympics, the 2013 FIBA Americas Championship, the 2014 FIBA Basketball World Cup, and the 2016 Summer Olympics.

Career statistics

NBA

Regular season

|-
| style="text-align:left;"| 
| style="text-align:left;"| L.A. Lakers
| 53 || 0 || 16.4 || .422 || .262 || .931 || 1.7 || 3.4 || .5 || .1 || 4.5
|-
| style="text-align:left;"| 
| style="text-align:left;"| L.A. Lakers
| 23 || 1 || 10.3 || .368 || .211 || .529 || 1.0 || 2.3 || .4 || .1 || 2.7
|- class="sortbottom"
| style="text-align:center;" colspan="2"| Career
| 76 || 1 || 14.6 || .409 || .250 || .783 || 1.5 || 3.1 || .5 || .1 || 3.9

EuroLeague

|-
| style="text-align:left;"| 2006–07
| style="text-align:left;"| Joventut
| 20 || 3 || 14.6 || .377 || .167 || .875 || 1.5 || 1.4 || .9 || .0 || 5.3 || 4.3
|-
| style="text-align:left;"| 2009–10
| style="text-align:left;"| Caja Laboral
| 16 || 1 || 20.9 || .526 || .308 || .852 || 1.8 || 3.9 || .6 || .0 || 8.3 || 9.4
|-
| style="text-align:left;"| 2010–11
| style="text-align:left;"| Caja Laboral
| 20 || 14 || 28.6 || .460 || .442 || .865 || 3.0 || 5.5 || .8 || .1 || 10.3 || 13.9
|-
| style="text-align:left;"| 2011–12
| style="text-align:left;"| Barcelona
| 21 || 21 || 23.7 || .504 || .439 || .867 || 2.0 || 4.4 || 1.0 || .0 || 8.5 || 10.7
|-
| style="text-align:left;"| 2012–13
| style="text-align:left;"| Barcelona
| 31 || 17 || 20.5 || .416 || .347 || style="background:#CFECEC;"|.972 || 2.2 || 3.4 || .6 || .0 || 8.0 || 8.7
|-
| style="text-align:left;"| 2013–14
| style="text-align:left;"| Barcelona
| 29 || 29 || 21.5 || .492 || .338 || .811 || 2.0 || 3.8 || .4 || .0 || 8.2 || 9.5
|-
| style="text-align:left;"| 2014–15
| style="text-align:left;"| Barcelona
| 28 || 16 || 22.1 || .403 || .365 || .833 || 2.3 || 4.4 || .5 || .0 || 7.6 || 8.5
|- class="sortbottom"
| style="text-align:center;" colspan="2"| Career
| 165 || 101 || 21.3 || .449 || .357 || .869 || 2.1 || 3.8 || .6 || .0 || 8.0 || 9.2

Honors
Joventut Badalona
FIBA EuroCup: 2005–06

Saski Baskonia
Spanish League: 2009–10

FC Barcelona
Spanish League: 2011–12, 2013–14
Spanish Cup: 2013
Spanish SuperCup: 2011

Canarias
FIBA Intercontinental Cup: 2020, 2023
Basketball Champions League: 2022

Individual awards
Brazilian League Breakthrough Player: (2003)
4× All-Spanish League Team: (2007–08, 2010–11, 2019–2020, 2020–2021)
FIBA AmeriCup All-Tournament Team: (2011)
FIBA Intercontinental Cup MVP: (2020)
Basketball Champion League First Team: (2019-2020)
Liga ACB Best Latin American Player of the Year: (2019-2020)、(2020-2021)

References

External links
Official website
Marcelo Huertas at acb.com 
Marcelo Huertas at euroleague.net
Marcelo Huertas at fiba.com
Marcelo Huertas at fibaeurope.com
Marcelo Huertas at legabasket.it 

1983 births
Living people
2006 FIBA World Championship players
2010 FIBA World Championship players
2014 FIBA Basketball World Cup players
2019 FIBA Basketball World Cup players
Basketball players at the 2007 Pan American Games
Basketball players at the 2012 Summer Olympics
Basketball players at the 2016 Summer Olympics
Bilbao Basket players
Brazilian expatriate basketball people in the United States
Brazilian expatriate basketball people in Spain
Brazilian expatriate sportspeople in Italy
Brazilian people of Italian descent
Brazilian people of Spanish descent
Brazilian men's basketball players
CB Canarias players
Club Athletico Paulistano basketball players
Esporte Clube Pinheiros basketball players
Expatriate basketball people in Italy
FC Barcelona Bàsquet players
Fortitudo Pallacanestro Bologna players
Italian expatriate basketball people in Spain
Italian expatriate basketball people in the United States
Italian men's basketball players
Joventut Badalona players
Lega Basket Serie A players
Liga ACB players
Los Angeles Lakers players
National Basketball Association players from Brazil
Naturalised citizens of Italy
Novo Basquete Brasil players
Olympic basketball players of Brazil
Pan American Games gold medalists for Brazil
Pan American Games medalists in basketball
People with acquired Italian citizenship
Point guards
Saski Baskonia players
Shooting guards
Basketball players from São Paulo
Undrafted National Basketball Association players
Medalists at the 2007 Pan American Games